Thomas J. Drennan (1877 – July 15, 1928) was appointed the tenth New York City Fire Commissioner by Mayor John F. Hylan.

Biography
He was born in 1877. He was appointed the tenth Fire Commissioner of the City of New York by Mayor John F. Hylan on January 1, 1918, and resigned his position on April 30, 1926. He died on July 15, 1928, of a heart attack. He was buried in Calvary Cemetery in Woodside, New York.

External links

References

Commissioners of the New York City Fire Department
1928 deaths
1877 births
Burials at Calvary Cemetery (Queens)